Jerónimo de Pasamonte (1553 - after 1605) was a Spanish military man, monk of the Cistercian Order, and a writer of the Golden Age.

Spanish male writers
1553 births
Year of death unknown